Andreas Lippoldt (born 3 July 1967) is a German former archer. He competed in the men's individual and team events at the 1992 Summer Olympics.

References

External links
 

1967 births
Living people
German male archers
Olympic archers of Germany
Archers at the 1992 Summer Olympics
People from Sindelfingen
Sportspeople from Stuttgart (region)